Chongqing Medical University (CQMU), previously referred to as the Chongqing University of Medical Sciences (CQUMS), was established in 1956 in Chongqing, China. It was originally a branch of the Shanghai First Medical College (now named the Shanghai Medical College of Fudan University).

Overview
CQMU is a state key university under the administration of the Chongqing Municipal Government with an integrated educational system of baccalaureate, masters, doctoral, and postdoctoral programs in medicine as well as other health-related fields.

It is one of approximately 30 medical universities in China that are approved by the Chinese Ministry of Education to enroll foreign students into the English-medium MBBS (Bachelor of Medicine and Bachelor of Surgery) program. It is recognized by the World Health Organization (WHO) and the ECFMG (Educational Committee for Foreign Medical Graduates) in the United States.

Organization and affiliations
CQMU has five hospitals directly under its administration, which are all rated as "Upper First-class Hospitals" in China. There are more than 6,000 beds in these hospitals. The annual outpatient visits total 5.5 million and the annual inpatient visits are 150,000.

In addition, CQMU has five affiliated hospitals indirectly under its administration, 27 teaching and clinical practicing hospitals, ten colleges, six departments, and a nursing school. Two more affiliated hospitals are currently under construction.

On the research front, CQMU has three state key laboratories under the Ministry of Education, one state key laboratory under the Chongqing Ministry of Science and Technology, one national engineering research center, 18 municipal key laboratories, 11 research institutes, six research centers, and 22 research laboratories.

Academic programs and research
CQMU offers five postdoctoral programs, 26 doctoral programs, 53 masters programs, and 46 specialities for undergraduates. It has four state key disciplines and 43 municipal key disciplines.

CQMU has accomplished several large-scale research projects including some state-level projects supported by the National Key Technology Research and Development Program in the 6th to 9th Five-year Plan for National Economic and Social Development, Key Program of National Natural Science Foundation, National Basic Research Program (known as '973 Program'), and the National Hi-Tech Research and Development Program (known as '863 Program').

The High-intensity Focused Ultrasonic Therapy System (HIFU), which was initiated by CQMU, is the first large-scale medical equipment system with completely independent intellectual property rights in China. It has been put into use in over 30 major hospitals in China and exported to about ten foreign countries, such as the EU, Russia, Japan, Korea, and Singapore.

The university publishes eight academic journals with international distribution.

Since 2008, CQMU has twice won the National Prize for Progress in Science and Technology, once won the National Award for Technological Invention once, and won over 80 municipal awards. There are many international students from India, Indonesia, Republic of the Congo, Mauritius, Vietnam, Pakistan, Nepal, Bangladesh, etc.

References

External links
Chongqing Medical University official website 
Chongqing Medical University official website

 
1956 establishments in China
Educational institutions established in 1956
Universities in China with English-medium medical schools
Universities and colleges in Chongqing